The tunica externa (New Latin "outer coat"), also known as the tunica adventitia (New Latin "additional coat"), is the outermost tunica (layer) of a blood vessel, surrounding the tunica media. It is mainly composed of collagen and, in arteries, is supported by external elastic lamina. The collagen serves to anchor the blood vessel to nearby organs, giving it stability.

The three layers of the blood vessels are: an inner tunica intima, a middle tunica media, and an outer tunica externa.

Structure 
The tunica externa is made from collagen and elastic fibers in a loose connective tissue. This is secreted by fibroblasts.

Function 
The tunica externa provides basic structural support to blood vessels. It prevents vessels from expanding too much from internal blood pressure, particularly arteries. It is also relevant in controlling vascular flow in the lungs.

Clinical significance
A common pathological disorder concerning the tunica externa is scurvy, also known as vitamin C deficiency. Scurvy occurs because vitamin C is essential for the synthesis of collagen, and without it, the faulty collagen cannot maintain the vein walls and rupture, leading to a multitude of problems.

Additional images

See also
 Adventitia

References

External links
  - "Bird, vessels (LM, High)"

Veins